The 1961–62 season was Blackpool F.C.'s 54th season (53rd consecutive) in the Football League. They competed in the 22-team Division One, then the top tier of English football, finishing thirteenth.

Blackpool also made it to the semi-finals of the League Cup. They were eliminated by Norwich City 4–3 on aggregate. Norwich won 4–1 at Carrow Road; Blackpool won 2–0 at Bloomfield Road.

Ray Charnley was the club's top scorer for the fourth consecutive season, with 36 goals (30 in the league and six in the League Cup).

Table

Notes

References

Blackpool F.C.
Blackpool F.C. seasons